Bastiaan Simon Boon (born 5 April 1967), popularly known as Bas Boon, is a Dutch producer and director best known for his work in Bad Guys (2008), Shut Up and Shoot! (2006) and How It All Went Down (2003). He is the founder of Golden Glory, a network association of mixed martial artists, and kickboxers headquartered in Curacau Dutch Antilles and had offices in the Netherlands and Thailand and several Golden Glory Gyms around the world. Bas is also the co-founder of the brand Fight Game and a project on YouTube named "Kato Boon Family Goes Pigshit.”

Early life and education 
Boon was born on 5 April to Kasper Boon, a noted Professor, Doctor, and Engineer. He grew up in Netherlands, Bastiaan.

Career 
Bas Boon started his career when he was 17 years old with the foundation of Nikko Toshogu Sports, a company that sold and produced martial arts equipment. Soon under the leadership of Boon, Nikko Toshogu expanded its business and also started a production company - Nikko Toshogu Press. Boon in his teenage years became the youngest promoter of professional martial arts competitions and produced and sponsored over 300 Thai Fighting and Kick Boxing events throughout Europe.

In late1980"s Boon cooperated with many famous promoters throughout Europe. Within a decade, he produced most of the fighting events in the Netherlands including the famous Satellite Muay Thai Events promoting/producing Holland vs Thailand.

Nbr 2 Boon was also founder of Glory World Series. In 2012, Boon sold the Golden Glory brand as well as his Nikko Toshogu Library together with Glory World Series to GSI where he became the president of the new company Glory for two years., Boon constructed the whole deal by himself and caused for the first time a serious financial injection into the sport of Kickboxing from Hedgefunds manager Pierre Andurand, Glory World Series became Glory Kickboxing.

In 1991, Boon created a fighting organization along with Joop Musterd and Cor Hemmers named Oriental Fight Promotions.

In 1995, Boon after mastering mixed martial arts founded Cage Fighting Championships. The first MMA Cage Fight Promotion show was organized together with Herni Corbeel in the Sportpaleis Antwerp Belgium.

Bas Boon founded the Golden Glory Team in 1999. It is a professional team of martial arts fighters and kickboxers who have participated in numerous championships including, Pride, K1, UFC and Too Hot To Handle.

Bas Boon has been in the sports domain for the past thirty years and is the owner of Seidokaikan Black Belt.

Boon has also created 22 episodes of the series Oriental Fight Promotions with the partners Cor Hemmers and Joop Mustard, that was broadcast across The Super Channel across Europe. He also produced 20 martial arts programs that were broadcast on Euro-Sport and FOX TV Network.

In 2012 Bas Boon facilitated the sales of the Golden Glory and Nikko library to Glory Sports International. Bas is also the co-founder of the brand Fight Game and a project on YouTube named "Kato Boon Family Goes Pigshit.”

Throughout his career, Bas Boon has trained and managed several sportspersons including Alistair Overeem, Sergei Kharitonov, Semmy Schilt, Stefan Leko, Siyar Bahadurzada, Marloes Coenen, Errol Zimmerman, Gokhan Saki, Nieky Holzken, Peter Arts, Ruslan Karaev, and others.

Filmography

Personal life 
Bas Boon is the father of Samantha, Kato, and Conan Boon. He is fluent in Dutch, German, French and English.

References 

1967 births
Living people